The House of Zagurović was a noble family in the Kotor region (now in Montenegro) of the Republic of Venice active between the 14th- and 16th century.

History 
The first mention of this family was in a 1326 document which recorded that a certain Ilija Nikolin Zagurović from Bar moved to Kotor and bought a house. He and his family became nobility when he married Ruža Nucije Gile from Kotor. Nikola Zagurović was mentioned in one document dated 8 August 1397. Stefan Zagurović, great-grandfather of poet Ilija, was mentioned in 1420 as a member of the Great Council of Venice. In 1437 Laurencije Zagurović was a trader in Kotor.

Ilija Zagurović, the grandfather of poet Ilija Zagurović, died in 1492. He had three sons, Franjo, Laurencije (Lovro) and Bernard. Franjo, who was a judge, died in 1516. He had a son Ilija (died in 1557) who was a notable poet. Bernard had two daughters, both married to members of Bona family. Laurencije distinguished himself during the defense of Venetian held Kotor from Ottoman attacks in 1503. His son Trifun was a member of the Venetian Senate as representative of Kotor in 1553. Trifun Zagurović was also notable trader in Kotor who was Kotor's deputy in Venetian Senate in 1459 and 1463.

One of the most notable members of Zagurović family was Jerolim Zagurović. He was Catholic. Notable poet Ilija Zagurović was uncle of Jerolim Zagurović. This branch of Zagurović family was related to the Serbian Crnojević family through the marriage of Jerolim Zagurović and Antonija Crnojević, the daughter of Lord Đurađ Crnojević of Zeta (r. 1489–96). They had a son, Anđelo, who lived in Venice. Jerolim's sons Anđelo and Ivan Zagurović ordered and financed publishing of the catechism written by Jacques Ledesma and translated probably by Bartol Sfondrati, printed in Venice in 1583 in printing house of Camilo Zanetti.

Family tree 

 Nikola Zagurović
 Ilija Nikolin Zagurović (fl. 1326)
 Nikola Zagurović (fl. 1397)
 Stefan Zagurović (fl. 1420)
 Laurencije Zagurović (fl. 1437)
 Ilija Zagurović 
 Franjo (d. 1516)
 Ilija (d. 1557), poet
 Laurencije (Lovro) and wife Franceskina
 Jerolim ( 1550—1580)
 Anđelo 
 Ivan
 Trifun (fl. 1553)
 Žunjo Batista
 Bernard
 Unknown daughter married to member of Bona family
 Unknown daughter married to member of Bona family

References

Sources 
 
 
 
 
 
 
 
 
 
 

Republic of Venice families
Venetian period in the history of Montenegro
Venetian Slavs